The Cyclopedia of Western Australia, edited by James Battye, was the pre-eminent written summary of Western Australia's development and context prior to World War I.

Review of progress
It was created at a time that saw progress, and was subtitled:

Contemporary reviews before and after publication reflected this sense. A similar review of the state of Western Australia appeared in publications at the centenary of the state in 1929.

Publication details
Several editions have been produced.

Battye, J.S. The Cyclopedia of Western Australia : an historical and commercial review : descriptive and biographical facts, figures and illustrations : an epitome of progress Adelaide: Printed and published for the Cyclopedia Company by Hussey & Gillingham, 1912. 2 volumes - . (xv, 775; xv, 1025 )
Illustrated edition (1912-1913) - same details as above
Facsimile edition: (1985) The Cyclopedia of Western Australia : an historical and commercial review : descriptive and biographical facts, figures and illustrations : an epitome of progress Carlisle, W.A : Hesperian Press.  (set)  (vol. 2)  (vol. 1)
Online edition

Content
Volume 1 
Aborigines, Agriculture, Biographies, Commerce and Industry, Fauna and Flora, Geology, Government, History of Western Australia, Immigration, Tourism, Lands department, Medical, Fremantle, Perth, Police, The Press, Public services, Railways, Trans-Australian Railway, Shipping, Suburban Municipalities, Telegraph and Telephone, Trade and Customs, Woods and Forests. 
Volume 2 
Agriculture, Churches and Ecclesiastical, Caves of WA, Mining, Hospitals, Schools and Education, Country Districts, Cities and suburbs, Dairying, Farming, Institutions, Explorers and exploration, Political parties, Pearling, Biographical index, Sporting and recreation.

See also
Australian Dictionary of Biography
Dictionary of Australian Biography
Historical Encyclopedia of Western Australia
J S Battye Library
Western Australia Post Office Directory
State Records Office of Western Australia

Notes

Further reading
 Review of the Cyclopedia on the occasion of the facsimile production in 1985 - The West Australian, 17 August 1985, p. 38-39

History of Western Australia
Books about Western Australia